Jean Zerbo (born 27 December 1943) is a Malian Roman Catholic prelate who has served as Archbishop of Bamako since 1998. Pope Francis raised him to the rank of Cardinal on 28 June 2017. He is the first cardinal from Mali.

Biography
Jean Zerbo was born on 27 December 1943 in Ségou, Mali, and ordained a priest there on 10 July 1971 by Pierre Louis Leclerc, Bishop of Ségou.

He continued his education first in Lyon in 1975 and then in Rome at the Pontifical Biblical Institute from 1977 to 1981, earning his licenciate in sacred scripture. Beginning in 1982, he was assigned to parish work in Markala while also teaching at the Major Seminary in Bamako.

On 21 June 1988, Pope John Paul II appointed him Auxiliary Bishop of Bamako and Titular Bishop of Accia.
On 20 November 1988, he was consecrated bishop by Jozef Tomko, Prefect of the Congregation for the Evangelization of Peoples, with Luc Auguste Sangaré, Archbishop of Bamako, and Joseph Paul Barnabé Perrot, Bishop emeritus of San, as co-consecrators.

On 19 December 1994, Pope John Paul II named him Bishop of Mopti and on 27 June 1998 Archbishop of Bamako.

Pope Francis raised Zerbo to the rank of cardinal at a consistory on 28 June 2017. At the end of May, Le Monde reported that Zerbo and other Malian prelates had secret Swiss bank accounts. Mali's conference of bishops responded that the financial dealings were "transparent", called the news report "tendentious", and noted that the Swiss Leaks release of financial documents appeared timed to embarrass the Catholic Church in Mali just when Zerbo's elevation put it in the public spotlight. La Stampa said that Zerbo's participation in the consistory demonstrated that an internal investigation had cleared him of financial wrongdoing.

As archbishop he has fostered dialogue between Christians and Mali's Muslim majority and participated in peace negotiations, as well as called for humanitarian aid to those affected by conflicts in the country. In 2012, he was part of a delegation of representatives of civil society that participated in discussions between Mali's ruling military regime and opposition political parties. He has been an advocate for national reconciliation ever since. He has also served as president of Caritas Mali, an international aid program for refugees and the poor.

On 4 October 2017 he was appointed a member of the Congregation for the Evangelization of Peoples. Francis made him a member of the Dicastery for the Laity, Family and Life on 23 December 2017.

References

External links

 
 

20th-century Roman Catholic bishops in Mali
Malian Roman Catholic bishops
20th-century Roman Catholic archbishops in Africa
21st-century Roman Catholic archbishops in Africa
Bishops appointed by Pope John Paul II
1943 births
Living people
People from Ségou
Cardinals created by Pope Francis
Malian cardinals
Members of the Congregation for the Evangelization of Peoples
Roman Catholic bishops of Mopti
Roman Catholic bishops of Bamako
Roman Catholic archbishops of Bamako